"Desperate Measures" is a song recorded by Canadian pop rock band Marianas Trench. It was released on July 4, 2012, as the third single on their third studio album Ever After. The song peaked on the Canadian Hot 100 chart at number 20 on the week of August 11, 2012 and was certified double platinum in Canada in October 2016.

Background
The track was written and produced by Josh Ramsay. MTV describes "Desperate Measures" as a power pop song. The song earned 2 nominations at the 2013 MuchMusic Video Awards for "Video of the Year" and "Pop Video of the Year" and they performed the song live at the award show.

Awards and nominations

|-
| 2013 || "Desperate Measures" || MMVAs Video of the Year || 
|-
| 2013 || "Desperate Measures" || MMVAs Pop Video of the Year || 
|-

Music video
The music video for "Desperate Measures" was released on July 4, 2012. It was directed by Kyle Davison and it is the follow-up from the "Fallout" music video of a five-video storyline accompanying the backstory of their album Ever After.

Charts

Weekly charts

Year-end chart

Certifications

References

2012 songs
2012 singles
604 Records singles
Songs written by Josh Ramsay
Marianas Trench (band) songs